New Zealand competed at the 2022 Commonwealth Games held in Birmingham, England, from 28 July to 8 August 2022. It is New Zealand's 22nd appearance at the Commonwealth Games, having competed at every Games since their inception in 1930. New Zealand finished fifth on the medal table, winning a total of 50 medals, 20 of which were gold. This makes these games New Zealand's best performance ever in terms of gold medals, beating the 17 won in Auckland at the 1990 Commonwealth Games, but third overall in terms of total medals, with 50, behind the 58 in 1990, and the 53 at the Games also in Auckland.

Tom Walsh and Joelle King served as the country's flagbearers during the opening ceremony. The flagbearer at the closing ceremony was cyclist Aaron Gate, who won four gold medals at the Games.

Medal tables

Unless otherwise stated, all dates and times are in British Summer Time (UTC+1), 11 hours behind New Zealand Standard Time (UTC+12).

| width="78%" align="left" valign="top" |

|style="text-align:left;width:22%;vertical-align:top;"|

Administration
Nigel Avery is Chef de Mission.

Competitors
The following is the list of number of competitors participating at the Games per sport/discipline.

Note

Athletics

A squad of eighteen athletes (eight men, ten women) was officially selected on 20 May 2022.

Track and road

Field

Badminton

Two players were officially selected on 27 May 2022.

3x3 basketball

By virtue of its status as the top Commonwealth Oceanian nation in the respective FIBA 3x3 Federation Rankings for men and women (on 1 November 2021), New Zealand qualified for both tournaments.

The rosters for both tournaments were announced on 30 June 2022.

Summary

Men's tournament

Roster
Jayden Bezzant
Dominique Kelman-Poto
Nikau McCullough
Tai Wynyard

Group B

Quarter-final

Women's tournament

Roster
Tiarna Clarke
Ella Fotu
Jillian Harmon
Kalani Purcell

Group B

Semi-final

Bronze medal match

Beach volleyball

By virtue of their position in the extended FIVB Beach Volleyball World Rankings (based on performances between 16 April 2018 and 31 March 2022), New Zealand qualified for both tournaments.

Four players were selected on 9 June 2022.

Men's tournament
Group C

Quarter-final

Women's tournament
Group A

Quarter-final

Semi-final

Bronze medal match

Boxing

A squad of eight boxers (five men, three women) was officially selected on 23 June 2022. Emile Richardson was later called up to replace David Nyika, whose left hand injury ruled out the possibility of his boxing for a third consecutive gold medal.

Cricket

By virtue of its position in the ICC Women's T20I rankings (as of 1 April 2021), New Zealand qualified for the tournament.

Fixtures were announced in November 2021.

Summary

Roster
Fifteen players were selected on 8 June 2022. Lauren Down and Jess Kerr have since withdrawn from the squad, with Claudia Green and Lea Tahuhu called up to replace them.

Sophie Devine (c)
Suzie Bates
Eden Carson
Izzy Gaze
Claudia Green
Maddy Green
Brooke Halliday
Hayley Jensen
Fran Jonas
Amelia Kerr
Rosemary Mair
Jess McFadyen
Georgia Plimmer
Hannah Rowe
Lea Tahuhu

Group stage

Semi-final

Bronze medal match

Cycling

A squad of thirty cyclists (eighteen men, twelve women) was officially selected on 10 June 2022. Ally Wollaston was unable to compete after injuring a wrist in a crash during stage 2 of the 2022 Tour de France Femmes.

Road
Road race

Time trial

Track
Sprint

Keirin

Time trial

Pursuit

Points race

Scratch race

Mountain bike
Anton Cooper was selected for the men's cross-country, but had to withdraw the day before the event after testing positive for COVID-19.

Diving

A squad of eight divers (six men, two women) was officially selected on 1 June 2022. Anton Down-Jenkins withdrew from the squad on 12 July 2022.

Gymnastics

A team of five artistic gymnasts and two rhythmic gymnasts was officially selected on 19 May 2022.

Artistic
Team final and individual qualification

Individual all-around final
Mikhail Koudinov and Ethan Dick qualified for the men's individual all-around final. 

Apparatus finals
Ethan Dick qualified sixth for the men's pommel horse final, and Sam Dick qualified eighth for the men's vault final. Sam Dick was 14th in qualifying for the rings, but progressed to the final as third reserve.

Rhythmic
Individual qualification

Individual finals

Hockey

By virtue of their position in the FIH World Rankings for men and women respectively (as of 1 February 2022), New Zealand qualified for both tournaments.

Detailed fixtures were released on 9 March 2022. The women's squad was announced on 9 June 2022, followed by the men's squad on 30 June 2022.

Summary

Men's tournament

Roster

David Brydon
George Enersen
Sean Findlay
Leon Hayward
Sam Hiha
Hugo Inglis
Sam Lane
Dane Lett
Harry Miskimmin
Joe Morrison
Hayden Phillips
Kane Russell
Aidan Sarikaya
Jacob Smith
Blair Tarrant
Dylan Thomas
Nic Woods
Simon Yorston

Group play

Fifth place match

Women's tournament

Roster

Olivia Merry (co-c)
Megan Hull (co-c)
Kaitlin Cotter
Anna Crowley
Stephanie Dickins
Katie Doar
Alia Jaques
Tyler Lench
Alex Lukin
Grace O'Hanlon
Hope Ralph
Brooke Roberts
Olivia Shannon
Rose Tynan
Frances Davies
Tarryn Davey
Aniwaka Haumaha
Tessa Jopp

Group play

Semi-final

Bronze medal match

Judo

A squad of seven judoka (three men, four women) was officially selected on 13 May 2022.

Lawn bowls

A squad of six parasport players (plus two directors) was officially selected on 15 March 2022.

Ten players were added to the squad on 22 June 2022. In addition, Deane Robertson was unable to satisfy international classification requirements and was replaced by Gerald Brouwers.

Men

Women

Parasport

Netball

By virtue of its position in the World Netball Rankings (as of 28 July 2021), New Zealand qualified for the tournament.

Partial fixtures were announced in November 2021, then updated with the remaining qualifiers in March 2022. The squad was announced on 27 June 2022.

Summary

Squad

Maia Wilson
Te Paea Selby-Rickit
Grace Nweke
Bailey Mes
Gina Crampton (c)
Shannon Saunders
Whitney Souness
Kate Heffernan
Kayla Johnson
Phoenix Karaka
Kelly Jury
Sulu Tone-Fitzpatrick (vc)

Group stage

Semi-final

Bronze medal match

Rugby sevens

New Zealand qualified for both the men's and women's tournaments. This was achieved through their positions in the 2018–19 / 2019–20 World Rugby Sevens Series and 2018–19 / 2019–20 World Rugby Women's Sevens Series respectively.

Both squads were announced on 29 June 2022.

Summary

Men's tournament

Squad

Leroy Carter
Che Clark
Dylan Collier (vc)
Scott Curry
Sam Dickson (c)
Moses Leo
Ngarohi McGarvey-Black
Sione Molia
Tone Ng Shiu
Akuila Rokolisoa
Caleb Tangitau
Regan Ware
Joe Webber (vc)

Pool A

Quarter-final

Semi-final

Bronze medal match

Women's tournament

Squad

Michaela Blyde
Kelly Brazier
Theresa Fitzpatrick
Sarah Hirini (c)
Stacey Fluhler
Jazmin Hotham
Shiray Kaka
Tyla Nathan-Wong
Risi Pouri-Lane
Alena Saili
Niall Williams
Tenika Willison
Portia Woodman

Pool A

Semi-final

Bronze medal match

Squash

A squad of seven players (three men, four women) was officially selected on 31 May 2022.

Singles

Doubles

Swimming

A squad of twelve swimmers (five men, seven women) was officially selected on 27 April 2022. The para swimmers qualified via the World Para Swimming World Rankings for performances registered between 31 December 2020 and 18 April 2022.

Triathlon

A squad of six triathletes (three per gender) was officially selected on 13 May 2022. Ainsley Thorpe withdrew from competition because of a COVID-19 infection.

Individual

Mixed relay

Weightlifting

A squad of seven weightlifters (four men, three women) was officially selected on 15 March 2022.

David Liti qualified by winning his category at the 2021 Commonwealth Weightlifting Championships in Tashkent, Uzbekistan. The other weightlifters qualified via the IWF Commonwealth Ranking List, which was finalised on 9 March 2022.

Wrestling

A squad of six wrestlers (four men, two women) was officially selected on 28 June 2022.

See also
New Zealand at the 2022 Winter Olympics
New Zealand at the 2022 Winter Paralympics

References

External links
New Zealand Olympic Committee official site
Birmingham 2022 Commonwealth Games official site

2022
Nations at the 2022 Commonwealth Games
Commonwealth Games